The Lost Tree, also known as the Arbre Thierry Sabine, is an isolated relict tree in the Ténéré region of the Sahara desert in northeast Niger.

The tree is an acacia clinging to its exposed root mound, and annually denuded by passing travellers seeking firewood. Despite its small size and diminished state, the tree's remoteness made it an important landmark on the desolate route between Adrar Bous in the northern Aïr Mountains and the outpost of Chirfa on the edge of the Djado Plateau. 

Thierry Sabine, founder of the Dakar Rally which ran in Africa from 1979 to 2007, died in a helicopter crash near Timbuktu during the 1986 rally. His ashes were scattered at the Lost Tree a few days later. The Ténéré held a special resonance with Sabine after he became stranded on the nearby Tchigaï Plateau as a participant in the 1977 Abidjan-Nice rally.
Maps printed for the rally after his death described it as "Arbre Thierry Sabine". A marble and brass plaque below the tree was dedicated to his memory. It's said the original plaque read: "For those who take a challenge – for those who follow a dream".

See also
Tree of Ténéré
List of individual trees

References

Individual trees in Niger
Geography of Niger
Tuareg